Cerastium regelii, commonly known as Regel's chickweed, is a species of perennial flowering plant belonging to the family Caryophyllaceae.

Its native range is subarctic.

References

regelii